Oquassa Chong (born 6 March 2000) is a Jamaican professional footballer who plays for Danish club Esbjerg fB as a forward.

Early life
Chong attended Jamaica College.

Club career
After playing for Harbour View in the National Premier League, Chong signed for Danish club Esbjerg fB in January 2022, signing a three-and-a-half year contract.

International career
Chong was called-up to the Jamaica national team for the first team in January 2022.

References

2000 births
Living people
Jamaican footballers
Association football forwards
National Premier League players
Harbour View F.C. players
Esbjerg fB players
Jamaican expatriate footballers
Jamaican expatriates in Denmark
Expatriate men's footballers in Denmark